Binalood or Binalud (Persian:بینالود), along with Golbahar, is one of the two planned cities of Razavi Khorasan province of Iran. The city of Binalood is situated near the south-eastern foot of Binalud Mountain Range.

Etymology 
The city is named after Mount Binalud.

Access points 
With the help of Road 44, this city is located near the intersection of this road with two main national roads of 97 and 95. The two bigger cities of Mashhad and Nishapur are also the closest vital cities of the country to this city. This city is also connected to the Iran's train network.

Economy 
The city's economy is dependent on Binalood Wind Farm and IKCO Kohrasan.

Gallery

See also 
 Razavi Khorasan Province
 Mashhad
 Nishapur

References

External links 
Official website

Cities in Razavi Khorasan Province
Coordinates on Wikidata